Acetoxolone (also known as acetylglycyrrhetic acid, acetylglycyrrhetinic acid, glycyrrhetinyl acetate and glycyrrhetic acid acetate) is a drug used for peptic ulcer and gastroesophageal reflux disease.  It is an acetyl derivative of glycyrrhetinic acid. It is found in Echinopora lamellosa.

See also
 Carbenoxolone
 Enoxolone

References

11β-Hydroxysteroid dehydrogenase inhibitors
Drugs acting on the gastrointestinal system and metabolism
Triterpenes
Carboxylic acids
Ketones
Acetate esters